WBHB (1240 AM) is a defunct radio station broadcasting an oldies format. Licensed to Fitzgerald, Georgia, United States.  The station was owned by Broadcast South, LLC.  The call letters were chosen in the mid-1940s to represent "Welcome Back Home Boys" in recognition of the soldiers who were returning home from World War II.

Sign-off
After the Federal Communications Commission (FCC) received a complaint in February 2018 that WBHB was not operating, Broadcast South admitted that it was only operating "approximately once per week". The station's transmitter caused "very significant interference" to co-located stations WKZZ and WRDO and electronic devices in the studio building, and several engineers were unable to determine the cause. Broadcast South turned in WBHB's license on March 23, 2018, and it was deleted from the FCC's database effective March 29, 2018.

References

External links
FCC Station Search Details: DWBHB (Facility ID: 39476)
History Cards for WBHB (covering 1946-1979)

BHB
Radio stations established in 1946
1946 establishments in Georgia (U.S. state)
Radio stations disestablished in 2018
2018 disestablishments in Georgia (U.S. state)
Defunct radio stations in the United States
BHB